The National Unification was a political party created on 27 October 1934 in Czechoslovakia. The party was established by a merger of the Czechoslovak National Democracy and two marginal parties, National League and National Front.

The party politically cooperated with the Vlajka movement. After German occupation of Czechoslovakia, party was merged into Party of National Unity.

References

See also
History of Czechoslovakia
Národní sdružení odborových organizací – the labour wing of the party

Political parties in Czechoslovakia
1934 establishments in Czechoslovakia
1938 disestablishments in Czechoslovakia
Political parties established in 1934
Political parties disestablished in 1938
Defunct agrarian political parties